Clockseed is the fourth studio album by Vampire Rodents, released on April 7, 1995 by Re-Constriction Records.

Music and lyrics 
Clockseed has a larger number of guest vocalists than its predecessor, with Daniel handling vocal duties on only four out of twenty-two tracks. All the vocalists involved were known through Chase, who sent out tapes to anyone who could lend their lyrics and vocals to a track. Daniel has noted that they all wrote their parts completely without his direction and called it a great fortune to receive such incredible results from people he had never met.

During the album's production, Re-Constriction Records label manager Chase mailed instrumental tapes to multiple musicians affiliated with the electro-industrial and Rivethead scenes for them to layer vocals and lyrics over. Christian Void of Killing Floor received the tracks for "Dowager's Egg" and "Mother Tongue" and chose the former to compose with. Concerning the lyrical content, Void stated "It is about people with disease like HIV and AIDS and how the public perceives them, and about things that happen to them because of their disease" that decries people being made into pariahs by society. Written by Chemlab vocalist Jared Louche, "Low Orbit" is about two of his deceased friend appearing to him in his sleep. He has said the song was "influenced by my having had a series of dreams involving Craig and another friend who had died of a brain tumor around that time. They were haunting the orbits of my dreams." Jason Bazinet of SMP (Sounds of Mass Production) has voiced his displeasure with his and Sean's work on "Revisioned", noting that they may have rushed the lyrics. It is about people with disease like HIV and AIDS and how the public perceives them, and about things that happen to them because of their disease.

Release and reception 
Despite being out of print, the album can still be bought through the Vampire Rodents eBay page.

Aiding & Abetting gave it a positive review, saying that "while a little more accessible than Lullaby Land, Clockseed is still a compendium of discord and sonic discrepancies."

Track listing

Accolades

Personnel 
Adapted from the Clockseed liner notes.

Vampire Rodents
 Andrea Akastia –  cello, violin
 Jing Laoshu – percussion
 Daniel Vahnke (as Anton Rathausen) – sampler, guitar, lead vocals (4, 7, 13, 17)
 Victor Wulf – piano, synthesizer

Production
 Trevor Henthorn – additional production (19)
 Robin James – cover art, illustrations
 Joan McAninch – production, engineering, mastering
 Jeff Motch – design
 Timothy Wiles (as Q) – mixing (2)

Additional musicians

 Maria Azevedo – lead vocals (18)
 Blake Barnes – lead vocals (20)
 Jason Bazinet – lead vocals and scratching (10)
 Chase – loops, design
 Dave Creadeau – lead vocals (15)
 Mark Edwards – lead vocals (8)
 Sarah Folkman – lead vocals (2)
 Dan Gatto – lead vocals (9)
 Mel Hammond – lead vocals (12)
 Sean Ivy – lead vocals and scratching (10)
 Pall Jenkins – lead vocals (21)
 Tony Lash – electric guitar (5)
 Linda LeSabre – lead vocals (16)
 Jared Louche – lead vocals (3)
 Dee Madden – lead vocals (6)
 Betty Martinez – lead vocals (22)
 Hae Su Oh – lead vocals (19)
 Rey Osburn – lead vocals (11)
 Boom chr Paige – lead vocals (15)
 Eric Powell – lead vocals (5)
 Steven Seibold – lead vocals (14)
 Christian Void – lead vocals (1)

Release history

References

External links 
 Clockseed at Bandcamp
 Clockseed at Discogs (list of releases)

1995 albums
Vampire Rodents albums
Re-Constriction Records albums